John Winthrop (1587/8–1649) was the founding governor of the Massachusetts Bay Colony.

John Winthrop may also refer to:
 John Winthrop the Younger (1606–1676), colonial governor of Connecticut
 John Winthrop (educator) (1714–1779), early American astronomer and professor at Harvard College
 John Winthrop (Greenough), a marble statue of the Massachusetts governor by Richard Saltonstall Greenough

See also
 Fitz-John Winthrop (1637–1707), soldier and colonial governor of Connecticut
 Jonathan Winthrop, a character in Passions